The Soviet Union (USSR) competed at the 1972 Summer Olympics in Munich, West Germany. 371 competitors, 298 men and 73 women, took part in 180 events in 22 sports.

The Soviet Union won 50 gold medal in the year, when the fiftieth anniversary of the USSR's founding was celebrated in the country. That fact pleased the Soviet authorities.

Medalists
The USSR finished first in the final medal rankings, with 50 gold and 99 total medals.

Gold

Athletics
 Mykola Avilov — men's decathlon
 Anatoliy Bondarchuk — men's hammer throw
 Valeriy Borzov — men's 100 metres
 Valeriy Borzov — men's 200 metres
 Lyudmila Bragina — women's 1500 metres
 Nadezhda Chizhova — women's shot put
 Faina Melnik — women's discus throw
 Viktor Saneyev — men's triple jump
 Jüri Tarmak — men's high jump

Basketball
Alzhan Zharmukhamedov, Zurab Sakandelidze, Gennady Volnov, Ivan Yedeshko, Sergei Kovalenko, Modestas Paulauskas, Anatoly Polivoda, Ivan Dvornyi, Mikheil Korkia, Aleksandr Belov, Sergey Belov and Aleksandr Boloshev — men's team competition.

Boxing
 Boris Kuznetsov — men's featherweight
 Vyacheslav Lemeshev — men's 71–75 kg

Canoeing
Aleksandr Shaparenko — men's K1 1000m kayak singles
Yuliya Ryabchynskaya — women's K1 500m kayak singles
Nikolai Gorbachev and Viktor Kratasyuk — men's K2 1000m kayak pairs
Yekaterina Kuryshko and Lyudmila Pinayeva-Khvedosyuk — women's K2 500m kayak pairs
Vladas Česiūnas and Yury Lobanov — men's C2 1000m Canadian pairs
Yury Stetsenko, Valery Didenko, Yury Filatov and Vladimir Morozov — men's K4 1000m kayak fours

Cycling
Valery Yardy, Gennady Komnatov, Valery Likhachov and Boris Shukov — men's team road race
Vladimir Semenets and Igor Tselovalnykov — men's 2000m tandem

Diving
 Vladimir Vasin — men's springboard

Equestrian
 Yelena Petushkova, Pepel, Ivan Kalita, Ikhor, Ivan Kizimov, Tarif — dressage team

Fencing
Viktor Sidyak — men's sabre individual
Svetlana Tširkova, Alexandra Zabelina, Yelena Belova-Novikova, Galina Gorokhova and Tatyana Samusenko-Petrenko — women's foil team

Gymnastics
Viktor Klimenko — men's pommel horse
Nikolay Andrianov — men's floor exercises
Lyudmila Turishcheva — women's all-around individual
Olga Korbut — women's balance beam
Olga Korbut — women's floor exercises
Tamara Lazakovich, Elvira Saadi, Lyudmila Turishcheva, Lyubov Burda, Olga Korbut and Antonina Koshel — women's team combined exercises

Judo
Shota Chochishvili — men's half-heavyweight (93 kg)

Modern pentathlon
Pavel Lednev, Boris Onyshchenko and Vladimir Shmelyov — men's team competition

Rowing

 Men's single sculls – 1st place ( gold medal)
 Yury Malyshev

 Men's double sculls – 1st place ( gold medal)
 Gennadi Korshikov
 Aleksandr Timoshinin

Sailing
Vitaly Dyrdyra and Valentyn Mankin — men's tempest class

Shooting
Yakov Zheleznyak — men's running game target

Volleyball
Nina Smoleyeva, Tatyana Tretyakova-Ponyaeva, Lyubov Tyurina, Inna Ryskal, Roza Salikhova, Tatyana Sarycheva, Tatyana Gonobobleva, Natalya Kudreva, Galina Leontyeva, Lyudmila Borozna, Lyudmila Buldakova and Vera Duyunova-Galushka — women's team competition

Water polo
Viacheslav Sobchenko, Vladimir Zhmudsky, Nikolay Melnikov, Leonid Osipov, Aleksandr Shidlovsky, Aleksandr Dreval, Vadim Gulyaev, Aleksandr Kabanov, Anatoly Akimov, Aleksey Barkalov and Aleksandr Dolgushin — men's team competition

Weightlifting
Mukharby Kirzhinov — men's lightweight
Jaan Talts — men's heavyweight
Vasily Alekseyev — men's super heavyweight

Wrestling
Rustem Kazakov — men's Greco-Roman bantamweight
Shamil Khisamutdinov — men's Greco-Roman lightweight
Valery Rezantsev — men's Greco-Roman light heavyweight
Anatoly Roshchin — men's Greco-Roman super heavyweight
Roman Dimitriyev — men's freestyle light flyweight
Zagalav Abdulbekov — men's freestyle featherweight
Levan Tediashvili — men's freestyle middleweight
Ivan Yarygin — men's freestyle heavyweight
Aleksandr Medved — men's freestyle super heavyweight

Silver

Athletics
 Yevgeny Arzhanov — men's 800 metres
 Valeriy Borzov, Aleksandr Kornelyuk, Vladimir Lovetskiy and Juris Silovs — men's 4 × 100 m relay
 Vladimir Golubnichy — men's 20 km walk
 Leonid Lytvynenko — men's decathlon
 Jānis Lūsis — men's javelin throw
 Veniamin Soldatenko — men's 50 km walk
 Nijole Sabaite — women's 800 metres

Equestrian
 Yelena Petushkova, her horse Pepel — dressage individual

Fencing
Leonid Romanov, Vasily Stankovich, Vladimir Denisov, Anatoly Koteshev and Viktor Putyatin — men's foil team
Viktor Sidyak, Eduard Vinokurov, Viktor Bazhenov, Vladimir Nazlymov and Mark Rakita — men's sabre team

Gymnastics
Viktor Klimenko — men's long horse vault
Mikhail Voronin — men's rings
Eduard Mikaelyan, Vladimir Shchukin, Mikhail Voronin, Viktor Klimenko, Nikolay Andrianov and Aleksandr Maleyev — men's team combined exercises
Olga Korbut — women's asymmetrical bars
Tamara Lazakovich — women's balance beam
Lyudmila Turishcheva — women's floor exercises

Judo
Vitali Kuznetsov — men's open class

Modern pentathlon
Boris Onyshchenko — men's individual competition

Shooting
Yevgeni Petrov — men's skeet shooting
Boris Melnik — men's free rifle, three positions

Swimming
Viktor Mazanov, Viktor Aboimov, Vladimir Bure and Igor Grivennikov — men's 4 × 100 m freestyle
Galina Stepanova-Prozumenshchykova — women's 100m breaststroke

Weightlifting
Dito Shanidze — men's featherweight

Wrestling
Anatoly Nazarenko — men's Greco-Roman middleweight
Nikolay Yakovenko — men's Greco-Roman heavyweight
Arsen Alakhverdiyev — men's freestyle flyweight
Gennady Strakhov — men's freestyle light heavyweight

Bronze

Archery
 Emma Gaptchenko — women's individual competition

Athletics
 Vasily Khmelevski — men's hammer throw

Cycling
Omar Pkhakadze — men's 1000m sprint (scratch)

Fencing
Vladimir Nazlymov — men's sabre individual
Galina Gorokhova — women's foil individual
Igor Valetov, Georgi Zažitski, Grigory Kriss, Viktor Modzalevsky and Sergey Paramonov — men's épée team

Football (soccer)
Gennady Yevryuzhikhin, Oganes Zanazanyan, Vyacheslav Semyonov, Andrei Yakubik, Yury Yeliseyev, Vladimir Pilguy, Yevgeny Rudakov, Yozhef Sabo, Yevgeny Lovchev, Sergei Olshansky, Vladimir Onishchenko, Viktor Kolotov, Anatoly Kuksov, Yury Istomin, Vladimir Kaplichnyi, Murtaz Khurtsilava, Arkady Andriasyan, Oleg Blokhin and Revaz Dzodzuashvili — men's team competition

Gymnastics
Nikolay Andrianov — men's long horse vault
Tamara Lazakovich — women's all-around individual
Lyudmila Turishcheva — women's side horse vault
Tamara Lazakovich — women's floor exercises

Judo
Anatoly Novikov — men's half middleweight (70 kg)
Givi Onashvili — men's heavyweight (>100 kg)

Modern pentathlon
Pavel Lednev — men's individual competition

Sailing
Viktor Potapov — men's Finn class

Shooting
Viktor Torshin — men's rapid-fire pistol

Swimming
Vladimir Bure — men's 100m freestyle
Viktor Mazanov, Vladimir Bure, Igor Grivennikov and Georgi Kulikov — men's 4 × 200 m freestyle
Galina Stepanova-Prozumenshchykova — women's 200m breaststroke

Volleyball
Aleksandr Saprykin, Yury Starunsky, Leonid Zayko, Vladimir Patkin, Yury Poyarkov, Vladimir Putyatov, Vladimir Kondra, Valery Kravchenko, Yevgeny Lapinsky, Viktor Borshch, Yefim Chulak and Vyatcheslav Domanyi — men's team competition

Weightlifting
Gennady Chetin — men's bantamweight

Wrestling
Ruslan Ashuraliyev — men's freestyle lightweight

Results by event

Archery

Women's individual competition:
Emma Gaptchenko — 2403 points (→  Bronze medal)
Keto Lossaberidze — 2402 points (→ 4th place)
Alla Peounova — 2364 points (→ 8th place)Men's individual competition:Victor Sidorouk — 2427 points (→ 7th place)
Mikhail Peounov 2397 points (→ 12th place)
Mati Vaikjärv — 2363 points (→ 24th place)

AthleticsMen's 100 metresVladimir Atamas
 First heat — 10.51s (→ did not advance)Men's 800 metresYevgeny Arzhanov →  Silver medal Heat — 1:48.3
 Semifinals — 1:46.3
 Final — 1:45.9

Ivan Ivanov
 Heat — 1:51.0
 Semifinals — 1:49.6 (→ did not advance)

Yevgeni Volkov
 Heat — 1:48.6
 Semifinals — 1:50.1 (→ did not advance)Men's 1,500 metresVolodymyr Panteley
 Heat — 3:42.3
 Semifinals — 3:41.6
 Final — 3:40.2 (→ 8th place)

Yevgeny Arzhanov
 Heat — DNS (→ did not advance)

Ivan Ivanov
 Heat — 3:42.3 (→ did not advance)Men's 5000 metresNikola Puklakov
 Heat — 13:57.6 (→ did not advance)

Vladimir Afonin
 Heat — 14:08.6 (→ did not advance)Men's 4 × 100 m relayAleksandr Kornelyuk, Vladimir Lovetskiy, Juris Silovs and Valeriy Borzov
 Heat — 39.15s
 Semifinals — 39.00s
 Final — 38.50s (→  Silver medal)Men's high jumpJüri Tarmak
 Qualifying round — 2.15m
 Final — 2.23m (→  Gold medal)

Rustam Akhmetov
 Qualifying round — 2.15m
 Final — 2.15m (→ 8th place)

Kestusis Shapka
 Qualifying round — 2.15m
 Final — 2.15m (→ 12th place)Women's javelin throwSvetlana Korolyova
 Qualifying round — 55.90 m
 Final — 56.36 m (→ 8th place)

Basketball

Men's team competitionPreliminary round (group B) Defeated Senegal (94–52)
 Defeated West Germany (87–63)
 Defeated Italy (79–66)
 Defeated Poland (94–64)
 Defeated Puerto Rico (100–87)
 Defeated Philippines (111–80)
 Defeated Yugoslavia (74–67)Semifinals Defeated Cuba (67–60)Final Defeated United States (51–50) →  Gold medalBoxingMen's light middleweight (– 71 kg)Valeri Tregubov
 First round — bye
 Second round — defeated Reggie Jones (USA), 3:2
 Third round — lost to Alan Minter (GBR), 0:5Men's heavyweight (+ 81 kg) Yuri Nesterov
 First round — lost to Duane Bobick (USA), 0:5

Canoeing

Cycling

Fifteen cyclists represented the Soviet Union in 1972.

Individual road race
 Valery Likhachov — 34th place
 Anatoly Starkov — 35th place
 Valery Yardy — did not finish (→ no ranking)
 Ivan Trifonov — did not finish (→ no ranking)

Team time trial
 Boris Shukhov
 Valery Yardy
 Gennady Komnatov
 Valery Likhachov

Sprint
 Omar Pkhak'adze
 Serhiy Kravtsov

1000m time trial
 Eduard Rapp
 Final — 1:07.73 (→ 8th place)

Tandem
 Igor Tselovalnikov and Vladimir Semenets —  Gold medalTeam pursuit
 Viktor Bykov
 Vladimir Kuznetsov
 Anatoly Stepanenko
 Aleksandr Yudin

DivingMen's 3m springboard Vladimir Vasin – 594.09 points (gold medal)Viacheslav Strahov – 556.20 points (6th place)
Vladimir Kapirulin – 329.46 points (18th place)Men's 10m platformDavid Ambarzumian – 463.56 points (5th place)
Vladimir Kapirullin – 459.21 points (7th place)
Aleksander Gendrikson – 431.04 points (12th place)Women's 3m springboardNatalia Kusnecova – 258.45 points (14th place)
Tatjana Shtyreva – 252.42 points (16th place)
Tamara Safonova – 252.09 points (17th place)Women's 10m platformAlla Seiina – 314.76 points (10th place)
Natalia Kuznecova – 184.02 points (13th place)
Tatjana Shtyreva – 177.33 points (19th place)

Equestrian

Fencing

20 fencers, 15 men and 5 women, represented the Soviet Union in 1972.

Men's foil
 Vladimir Denisov
 Anatoly Koteshev
 Vasyl Stankovych

Men's team foil
 Vasyl Stankovych, Viktor Putyatin, Anatoly Koteshev, Vladimir Denisov, Leonid Romanov

Men's épée
 Igor Valetov
 Sergey Paramonov
 Grigory Kriss

Men's team épée
 Grigory Kriss, Viktor Modzalevsky, Georgi Zažitski, Sergey Paramonov, Igor Valetov

Men's sabre
 Viktor Sidyak
 Vladimir Nazlymov
 Mark Rakita

Men's team sabre
 Mark Rakita, Viktor Sidyak, Vladimir Nazlymov, Eduard Vinokurov, Viktor Bazhenov

Women's foil
 Galina Gorokhova
 Yelena Novikova-Belova
 Aleksandra Zabelina

Women's team foil
 Yelena Novikova-Belova, Galina Gorokhova, Aleksandra Zabelina, Svetlana Tširkova, Tatyana Petrenko-Samusenko

Football

Gymnastics

Handball

Men's team competition
The Soviet team came away from the three-game opening round with no losses, but only one win. Ties with Denmark and Sweden and a win over Poland put the Soviet Union in a tie with Sweden at the top of the division. Since both teams moved on to the second round, the fact that Sweden won the tie-breaker mattered little. The Soviets' hopes were high after the first game of the second round, a win over East Germany that put the team on top of the division. However, their subsequent loss to Czechoslovakia dropped them to third in the group. This meant that they played in a game for fifth and sixth place against host nation West Germany. Their win was little consolation for being eliminated from medal contention.Men's team competition:Soviet Union – 5th place (3–1–2)Team roster Nikolai Semenov
 Mikhail Ischenko
 Aleksandr Panov
 Vladimir Maksimov
 Valentin Kulev
 Vasili Ilyin
 Anatoli Shevchenko
 Yuri Klimov
 Mikhail Luzenko
 Alexander Resanov
 Valeri Gassi
 Albert Oganesov
 Yan Vilson
 Yuri Lagutin
 Ivan Usaty

Judo

Modern pentathlon

Three male pentathletes represented the Soviet Union in 1972.Men's individual competitionBoris Onishenko — 5335 pts (→  Silver medal)
Pavel Lednev — 5328 pts (→  Bronze medal)
Vladimir Shmelev — 5302 pts (→ 5th place)Men's team competitionOnishenko, Lednev and Shmelev — 15968 pts (→  Gold medal)

Rowing

The Soviet Union had 26 male rowers participate in all seven rowing events in 1972.Men's single scullsYury Malyshev
Heat — 7:42.67
Semifinals — 8:13.49
Final — 7:10.12 (→  Gold medal)

 Men's coxless pair – 8th place
 Vladimir Polyakov
 Nikolay Vasilyev

 Men's coxed pair
Vladimir Eshinov, Nikolay Ivanov and Yuriy Lorentsson
Heat — 7:43.84
Semifinals — 8:07.34
Final — 7:24.44 (→ 5th place)

 Men's coxless four – 4th place
 Anatoly Tkachuk
 Igor Kashurov
 Aleksandr Motin
 Vitaly Sapronov

 Men's coxed four – 4th place
 Volodymyr Sterlik
 Vladimir Solovyov
 Aleksandr Lyubaturov
 Yury Shamayev
 Igor Rudakov

 Men's eight – 4th place
 Aleksandr Ryazankin
 Viktor Dementyev
 Sergey Kolyaskin
 Aleksandr Shitov
 Valery Bisarnov
 Boris Vorobyov
 Vladimir Savelov
 Aleksandr Martyshkin
 Viktor Mikheyev

Sailing

Shooting

Fourteen male shooters represented the Soviet Union in 1972. Yakiv Zhelezniak won gold, Boris Melnik and Yevgeny Petrov won silvers and Viktor Torshin won a bronze medal.

25 m pistol
 Viktor Torshin
 Igor Bakalov

50 m pistol
 Grigory Kosykh
 Vladimir Stolypin

300 m rifle, three positions
 Boris Melnik
 Valentin Kornev

50 m rifle, three positions
 Vladimir Agishev
 Vitaly Parkhimovich

50 m rifle, prone
 Vitaly Parkhimovich
 Valentin Kornev

50 m running target
 Yakiv Zhelezniak
 Valerii Postoyanov

Trap
 Aleksandr Alipov
 Aleksandr Androshkin

Skeet
 Yevgeny Petrov
 Yury Tsuranov

SwimmingMen's 100m freestyleVladimir Bure
 Heat — 52.87s
 Semifinals — 52.60s
 Final — 51.77s (→  Bronze medal)

Igor Grivennikov
 Heat — 53.64s
 Semifinals — 53.55s
 Final — 52.44s (→ 6th place)

Georgi Kulikov
 Heat — 53.78s
 Semifinals — 53.68s (→ did not advance)Men's 200m freestyleVladimir Bure
 Heat — 1:56.15
 Final — 1:57.24 (→ 7th place)

Viktor Mazanov
 Heat — 1:57.92 (→  did not advance)

Georgi Kulikov
 Heat — 1:57.04 (→  did not advance)Men's 4 × 100 m freestyle relayVladimir Bure, Viktor Mazanov, Viktor Aboimov and Georgy Kulikov
 Heat — 3:32.72
Vladimir Bure, Viktor Mazanov, Viktor Aboimov and Igor Grivennikov
 Final — 3:29.72 (→  Silver medal)Men's 4 × 200 m freestyle relayViktor Aboimov, Alexsandr Samsonov, Viktor Mazanov and Georgi Kulikov
 Heat — 7:51.44
Igor Grivennikov, Viktor Mazanov, Georgi Kulikov and Vladimir Bure
 Final — 7:45.76 (→  Bronze medal)

Volleyball

Men's team competitionPreliminary round (group A) Defeated Tunisia (3–0)
 Defeated South Korea (3–0)
 Defeated Bulgaria (3–1)
 Defeated Czechoslovakia (3–0)
 Defeated Poland (3–2)Semifinals Lost to East Germany (1–3)Bronze medal match Defeated Bulgaria (3–0) →  Bronze medalTeam roster'''
Viktor Borsch
Vyacheslav Domany
Vladimir Patkyn
Leonid Zayko
Yuri Starunsky
Alex Saprikyne
Vladimir Kondra
Elim Chulak
Vladimir Poutyatov
Valery Kravchenko
Yevgeny Lapinsky
Yuri Poyarkov

Water polo

Weightlifting

Wrestling

Medals by republic
In the following table for team events number of team representatives, who received medals are counted, not "one medal for all the team", as usual. Because there were people from different republics in one team.

Top 5 sports societies
In the following table for team events number of team representatives, who received medals are counted, not "one medal for all the team", as usual. Because there were people from different sports societies in one team.

Bibliography

References

 – for medal stats by republic and by sports society

Nations at the 1972 Summer Olympics
1972
Summer Olympics